"Bless your heart" is a phrase common to the Southern United States. The phrase has multiple meanings and is used to express genuine sympathy but sometimes as an insult that conveys condescension, derision, or contempt. It may also be spoken as a precursor to an insult to mitigate its severity. Meanings range from "you are dumb but can't help it" to "fuck you" and are primarily imparted through context and tone. While common in the South, it is primarily used by individuals who wish to "be sweet” and do not wish to "act ugly."

Notable examples
In 2016, Nikki Haley, then governor of South Carolina, received extensive press coverage for saying the phrase in response to an attack by presidential candidate Donald Trump.

Speaking about ex-husband Ben Affleck's large back tattoo of a rising phoenix, Jennifer Garner said, "You know what we would say in my hometown about that? 'Bless his heart.

See also
 Culture of the Southern United States

References

Euphemisms
Quotations from religion
Slang of the Southern United States